{{Infobox military conflict
| conflict          = 1994 North Korean nuclear crisis
| place             = Korean PeninsulaSea of Japan
| partof            = Inter-Korean conflict
| date              = 12 March 1993 – 21 October 1994
| result            = Agreed Framework signed between United States and North Korea
Temporary suspension of North Korean nuclear weapons program
Cessation of Team Spirit exercises
| combatant1        = 
| combatant2        = 
| commander1        =  Kim Il-Sung (before 8 July 1994) Kim Jong-Il (after 8 July 1994)
| commander2        =  Bill Clinton Kim Yong-sam
| strength2         =  US Army Pacific
 USAF PACAF
 US 7th Fleet
 USS Kitty Hawk
 CVW-15
 USS Independence
 CVW-5
 ROK Armed Forces
| strength1         =  Korean People's Army
| image             = A US Navy F-14 Tomcat is signaled to taxi and turn after making an arrested landing on the flight deck of USS KITTY HAWK (CV-63) as part of the exercise. The KITTY HAWK, and its emb - DPLA - 68eb3ee9e12534303c2a8fd5ca45bb86.jpeg
| caption           = Flight Operations aboard the USS Kitty Hawk on 4 December 1994
| width             = 320
}}

The 1994 North Korean nuclear crisis was a crisis on the Korean Peninsula, mainly revolving around North Korea's nuclear program. Largely caused by North Korea's announcement that it would withdraw from the Nuclear Non-Proliferation Treaty (NPT) in 1993 the tensions could have led to a war between North Korea and the US had not been for an agreement reached between Former President Jimmy Carter and then leader Kim Il-Sung. It led to North Korea and the United States signing the Agreed Framework in October 1994, effectively ending the crisis.

Background 

North Korea's involvement in the NPT went back as December 1985, when it signed the treaty, around the same it built its first reactor. At the end of the Cold War in 1991, the United States removed all of its nuclear weapons that were based abroad including the last 100 or so of their tactical nuclear weapons from South Korea. Although initially criticizing the US, North Korea's response to this withdrawal changed when on November 26, North Korea stated it would allow US inspectors into its nuclear facilities if all of nuclear weapons were removed. Although IAEA inspectors were allowed to inspect some of these facilities, many were still closed off as North Korea claimed that they had military secrets, leading to suspicion that they were for a Nuclear weapons program. 1992 also saw the US and South Korea cancel the Team Spirit '92 joint exercises, although Team Spirit '93 would be held in February 1993.

Main tensions

1993 
After months of disagreements over the 1991 inspection agreements, Pyongyang announced on 12 March 1993 that they would plan to pull out from the NPT Treaty. In response to this, Russia carried out minor economic sanctions against North Korea that it threatened as early as 1991. North Korea however reversed their decision after meeting with US diplomats in New York. Pyongyang agreed to thus follow IAEA safeguards as well as allowing inspections at seven declared nuclear sites in the country. Relations between North Korea and the IAEA soon failed in September of that year and US and the IAEA warned North Korea. After pressuring for dialogue to resume between it and Pyongyang, in December, the US demands that the seven nuclear sites in North Korea be opened to inspectors.

1994 
After promising inspections the previous year, beginning on 3 March 1994, IAEA inspectors were allowed for two weeks to inspect most of North Korea's nuclear facilities. The IAEA is however prevented from inspecting their main radiochemical facility, used for fuel reprocessing. On 17 March, The New York Times reports that the US had cancelled talks with the North and that Team Spirit '94 would be conducted. This was followed by the announcement of a shipment of Patriot SAM systems to South Korea on the 23rd. The 2nd Battalion, 7th Air Defense Artillery would later be replaced by a more permanent Patriot missile unit in the form of the 1st Battalion, 43rd Air Defense Artillery Regiment in October 1994. 

During June 1994, the US considered using Operation Plan 5027 (OPLAN 5027), the war plan that was to be used in case of a North Korean attack. This was due to the fear that North Korea would view the recent buildup of US troops and as well as evacuations as a sign of an attack and thus invade South Korea. Park Yong Su, a North Korean negotiator threatened to turned Seoul into a "sea of flames". The Pentagon however wanted to use the 'Middle Option' of moving around 10,000 more troops, several F-117As and a Carrier Battlegroup to the region. There were also plans to take out the Yongbyon Nuclear facility with the F-117s as well as Cruise Missiles, in order to prevent North Korea creating nuclear devices. This plan was however called off when then Former President Carter met with Kim Il-Sung and the two agreed to the basis of what would be the Agreed Framework.

However, on 8 July 1994, Kim Il-Sung died from a heart attack he suffered the previous day. Due to this as well as the recent instability in the Peninsula, the USS Kitty Hawk, CVW-15 and their Battlegroup were diverted from their deployment to the Persian Gulf and instead were ordered to stay in the Western Pacific and the Korean Peninsula. The USS Independence (which was based in Yokosuka, Japan) also conducted operations in the Korean Peninsula. Kim Yong-sam would later claim in 2009 that there were "33 destroyers and two aircraft carriers" of the US Navy in the Sea of Japan waiting to strike North Korea. He also claimed to have opposed the US option of war because of the consequences. The US and South Korea however also offered to cancel Team Spirit '94 as an incentive for North Korea to open dialogue with them. Team Spirit '93 would in fact be the last Team Spirit exercise held.

Aftermath 

On 21 October 1994, the Agreed Framework was signed in Geneva, effectively freezing North Korea's nuclear program. Despite this, almost a decade later, due to tensions between the US and North Korea over the latter's missile transfers to Iran, North Korea would resume its nuclear weapons program.

References 

1993 in Korea
1994 in Korea
1993 in North Korea
1994 in North Korea
1990s in Korea
North Korea–United States relations
North Korea–South Korea relations
Korean War
Aftermath of the Korean War
1993 in South Korea
1994 in South Korea
1990s in North Korea
1990s in South Korea
Nuclear program of North Korea
Presidency of Bill Clinton